Prime University or PU is a private university in Mirpur, Dhaka, Bangladesh. The university was established according to the Private University Act of 1992. It is affiliated with the University Grants Commission of Bangladesh. A group of educationists and philanthropists established this institute in 2002. PU is the first venture of the Prime Foundation. The university has ten undergraduate and eight graduate programs offered by the five faculties.

Campus
Prime University is located at 114/116 Mazar Road, Mirpur-1, Dhaka 1216, Bangladesh.

Former vice-chancellors 
 Prof. Dr. Md. Jahangir Alam (present) 
 Prof. Dr. M. Abdus Sobhan
 Prof. Prafulla Chandra Sarker
 Prof. Mesbah-Us-Saleheen

Faculties
PU has eight departments in five faculties.
 Faculty of Engineering
 Faculty of Information Technology
 Faculty of Business Studies
 Faculty of Art and Social Science
 Faculty of Law

Academic programs
PU offers the following graduate and undergraduate programs:

Bachelor's level
 BSc in Computer science and Engineering (CSE)
 BSc in Electronics and Telecommunication Engineering (ETE)
 BSc in Electrical and Electronics Engineering (EEE)
 BSc in Civil Engineering (CE)
 Bachelor of Business Administration (BBA)
 BA (Hons) in English
 LLB(Hons)
 BA (Hons) in Bangla
 Bachelor of Education (BEd)

Master's level
 Master of Business Administration Regular and Executive (MBA)
 LLM (Regular)
 LLM (Preli & Final)
 MA in English
 MA in English language Teaching (ELT)
 M.A. in English Literature
 Masters of Education (MEd)

Laboratories
Prime University has built up its laboratories, which are:
 Physics Lab
 Chemistry Lab
 Computer Lab
 Software Engineering Lab
 Microprocessor Lab
 Electronics and Digital Logic Lab
 Electrical Circuit and Measurements Lab
 Energy Conversion and Drives Lab
 Digital Signal Processing Lab
 Microwave Engineering Lab
 Fiber-optic Communication Lab
 GSM Lab

Innovation hub
A platform consisting of university teachers, students, researchers, which have been formed with the overall supervision of Innovation Lab to expand the technology research at the university level.

Library
The Prime University Library has resources like books, reports and bound journals, CD ROMs and databases, audio & video cassettes etc. Presently, there are more than 30,000 books covering liberal arts, social sciences and commerce, particularly business, management, marketing, finance, economics, computer science and engineering, telecommunication engineering, electrical & electronics engineering, history and culture, sociology as well as language courses like English, Arabic, Chinese, Korean etc. The CD ROMs contain contents of books, matters relating to the environment, history, culture, culinary arts, etc. It also has a digital library, a focused collection of digital objects that can include text, images, audio and video.

Academic semester
 Spring (February to May)
 Summer (June to September)
 Fall (October to January)

Research center
PU has a research center named Center for Research, Human Resource Development & Publications (CRHP).

Alumni association
The Prime University Alumni Association or PUALUMNI is located on campus.

Journals and publications
Prime University Journal is an interdisciplinary journal published in January and July of each year and is registered with National Serials Data Program, Library of Congress. The journal contains research-based articles on social science, law, education, business, arts, science and technology. The first edition was published in July 2007 by CRHP. It also publishes a newsletter.

Convocation

Prime University held its first convocation on 14 October 2008 at Bangabandhu International Conference Center. Almost 3,200 students received their degrees at that ceremony. The second was held on 24 April 2016 at the same place. This time almost 6,000 students received their degrees. The chief guest was Education Minister Nurul Islam Nahid.

Footnotes

Private universities in Bangladesh
Universities and colleges in Dhaka
2002 establishments in Bangladesh
Educational institutions established in 2002